Miliusa horsfieldii (synonym Saccopetalum prolificum) is a species of plant in the Annonaceae family. It is recorded from China and Indo-China.  It is threatened by habitat loss.

References

Annonaceae
flora of Indo-China
Vulnerable plants
Taxonomy articles created by Polbot
Taxobox binomials not recognized by IUCN